Artis Gilmore (born September 21, 1949) is an American former professional basketball player who played in the American Basketball Association (ABA) and National Basketball Association (NBA). Gilmore was inducted into the Naismith Memorial Basketball Hall of Fame on August 12, 2011.

A star center during his two collegiate years at Jacksonville University, Gilmore led the Dolphins to the NCAA Division I championship game in 1970, where his team was beaten 80–69 by the UCLA Bruins. Gilmore remains the top player in rebounds per game in the history of NCAA Division I basketball.

Gilmore followed five All-Star seasons with the Kentucky Colonels of the ABA by becoming the first overall pick in the 1976 ABA Dispersal draft, which dispersed the players in the ABA clubs, such as the Colonels, that did not join the NBA. During his career, Gilmore was an 11-time All-Star, the ABA Rookie of the Year, and an ABA MVP. Nicknamed "The A-Train", the  Gilmore once played in 670 consecutive games.

Early years
Gilmore was born in Chipley, Florida, one of 10 children. He was raised there, and attended Roulhac High School. Gilmore was 6'5" at age 15. Initially most interested in playing football, Gilmore could not play because his father, who was a fisherman, could not afford the required insurance for him to participate. When public schools were integrated, he attended Chipley High School for one week before leaving home to attend Carver High School in Dothan, Alabama, a larger community 35 miles to the north. He graduated from Dothan's Carver High School in 1967, at 6'10" as a Third Team All-American.

College career
Gilmore played college basketball beginning at Gardner–Webb Junior College in Boiling Springs, North Carolina from 1967 to 1969. Under coach Eddie Holbrook, Gilmore led Gardner-Webb to the NJCAA tournament in 1968 and 1969, playing alongside George Adams. Gilmore averaged 22.5 points and 16.0 rebounds in his two seasons, with career totals of 1,530 points and  1,150 rebounds at Gardner-Webb.

Reflected Coach Holbrook, “Bringing in a player like Artis who was 7-foot-2 and could do so many things drew a lot of attention. But Artis showed that he was deserving of that attention. I would say Artis and George Adams were two of the hardest-working players I ever coached. They were relentless. Anything you asked them to do or pushed them to do, they did it — or tried to do it anyway.”

In 1969–1970, Gilmore transferred to Jacksonville University. He led the Jacksonville Dolphins team to a 27–2 record under coach Joe Williams.  In the 1970 NCAA tournament Gilmore led the team to the NCAA Championship game, where they lost 80–69 to coach John Wooden and the UCLA Bruins; Gilmore scored 19 points with 16 rebounds. They defeated Western Kentucky 109–96 (30/19), the University of Iowa 104–103 (30/17) and the University of Kentucky 106–100 (24/20) to reach the Final Four. The Dolphins defeated St. Bonaventure 91–83 (29/21) in the Semi-Final. For the season, Gilmore averaged 26.5 and 22.2 rebounds per game.

At Jacksonville college, Gilmore became one of five college basketball players ever to average at least 20 points and 20 rebounds over his career at 24.3 and 22.7. Gilmore led the NCAA in rebounding both years at Jacksonville, and his career average of 22.7 rebounds per game is still the highest in NCAA Division I history.

Professional career

ABA

Kentucky Colonels (1971–1976)
Gilmore was drafted by the Kentucky Colonels in the 1971 American Basketball Association draft, and by the Chicago Bulls in the 1971 NBA draft. ABA teams were interested in keeping Gilmore in the ABA and wanted to ensure he was signed by a team that could afford him. Therefore, he went to Kentucky with the 7th pick and signed a 10-year, $2.5 million contract. NBA teams knew Gilmore would not sign, so the Bulls strategically used a 7th round pick to secure any possible future rights to Gilmore.

He was so immediately dominant that he earned the rare distinction of being selected for both the ABA Rookie of the Year Award and the ABA Most Valuable Player Award in 1971–1972, both over Virginia Squires rookie Julius Erving. Kentucky finished 68–16 after being 44–40 the season before. The following season Gilmore's strong play continued, as he and Dan Issel led the Colonels to a 
56–28 record and the 1973 ABA Playoffs. Eventually, after beating the Carolina Cougars in a seven-game division finals series, Gilmore and the Colonels made it to the ABA Finals, but lost to the Indiana Pacers in another hard-fought seven-game series, despite Gilmore averaging 22.1 points, 17.3 rebounds, 5.3 assists, and 4 blocks per game.

Over his five-year ABA career, Gilmore led the ABA four times in rebounding average, twice in both field goal percentage and blocks per game, and once in personal fouls. He was named to the All-ABA First team five straight seasons, and the All-Defense team four times. He played in the ABA All-Star Game all five years he was in the league, earning the 1974 game's MVP.

In 1974–75, Gilmore, alongside teammate Dan Issel led 1974–75 Kentucky Colonels to the 1975 ABA championship, as Gilmore was dominant, being named the ABA Playoffs Most Valuable Player. In the final game of the series against the Indiana Pacers, Gilmore scored 28 points and grabbed 31 rebounds in front of 16, 000 fans at Freedom Hall.

During his days as an ABA dominator, Gilmore established league records for career blocked shots (1431), blocked shots in a season (422 in the 1971–72 season), and rebounds in a game (40). He averaged 22.3 points and 17.7 rebounds, 58.5% shooting, 3.4 blocks and 3.0 assists per game in his 5 seasons and 440 ABA games"

NBA

Chicago Bulls (1976–1982)
The ABA disbanded after the 1976 season. Four of its teams (Denver Nuggets, Indiana Pacers, New York Nets, and San Antonio Spurs) were absorbed into the NBA in the ABA–NBA merger, and the remainder, including the Kentucky Colonels, folded. As a result, Gilmore went into the special 1976 ABA dispersal draft, and was chosen first overall by the Chicago Bulls. He signed with them for $1.1 million over three years. During his first season with the Bulls, Gilmore led the team in scoring, rebounds, and blocks, while also helping the Bulls hold their opponents to a league-best 98 points per game. On March 18, 1977, Gilmore scored an NBA-career-high 42 points, along with grabbing 15 rebounds and recording 9 assists, in a 114–112 win over the Kansas City Kings. However, in the 1977 NBA Playoffs, the Bulls lost to the eventual champion Trail Blazers 2–1 in the first round.

In total Gilmore received four All-Star selections in five solid basketball seasons in Chicago (19.3 points per game and 11.1 rebounds per game).

San Antonio Spurs (1982–1987)
Gilmore was traded to the San Antonio Spurs in July 1982 for Dave Corzine, Mark Olberding, and cash considerations. There, coached by Stan Albeck, he teamed with spidery 6’8” shooting guard George “The Iceman” Gervin to provide the Spurs with a potent inside-out game. During the 1982-83 San Antonio Spurs season, his first with the team, Gilmore helped the team finish in first place in their division with a record of 53–29. During the playoffs, Gilmore and the Spurs advanced by Gilmore's former Kentucky Colonel co-star Dan Issel and the Denver Nuggets in the second round, before facing the Los Angeles Lakers in the Western Conference Finals. In Game 2 of the series, Gilmore led the Spurs to a 122–113 win with 27 points, 20 rebounds, and 5 blocks. However, the Spurs would ultimately lose to the Lakers in six games.
 
While the Spurs would continue to make the postseason in subsequent years, they would not again advance out of the first round during Gilmore's tenure. He was twice named an All-Star in San Antonio through 1987.

Chicago Bulls (1987)
Gilmore rejoined the Bulls for part of the 1988 season before being released.

Boston Celtics (1988)
Gilmore finished his NBA career with the Boston Celtics in 1988. Gilmore and the Celtics would advance to the conference finals, though he played just over 6 minutes per postseason game as a reserve.

Italian League
Gilmore played the 1988–89 season with Arimo Bologna of the Italian league, where he averaged 12.3 points and 11.0 rebounds and made the European All-Star Team.

NBA achievements
Gilmore played in a total of six NBA All-Star Games. He led the NBA in field goal percentage in four consecutive seasons, including a career-best 67% during the 1980–81 season — at the time, the third-highest percentage in NBA history. At the time of his retirement in 1989, Gilmore was the NBA's career leader in field goal percentage (minimum 2,000 shots made) with 59.9%.

Personal life
In 1972, Gilmore married his college sweetheart Enola Gay. They have had five children.

In 2007, Gilmore took a position as Special Assistant to the President at Jacksonville University, his alma mater, serving in various public relations capacities.

Gilmore provides radio color commentary for Jacksonville University on the school's flagship station, WJXL. Gilmore was also a frequent guest on the basketball call-in show Ballin' with Al Edwards, also on WJXL.

Honors
In 1993, Gilmore was inducted into the Stars Hollow University Hall of Fame.

Gilmore was inducted into the Gardner-Webb Athletics Hall of Fame in 1995.

Despite retiring among all time pro basketball leaders in several statistical categories, Gilmore was not elected to the Naismith Memorial Basketball Hall of Fame until April 2011. 

The Naismith Memorial Basketball Hall of Fame Bio of Gilmore reads:

In May 2012, Gilmore was inducted into the Alabama Sports Hall of Fame.

ABA and NBA career statistics

Regular season

|-
| style="text-align:left;"| 
| style="text-align:left;"| Kentucky (ABA)
| bgcolor="CFECEC"|84* || – || 43.6 || bgcolor="CFECEC"|.598* || – || .646 || bgcolor="CFECEC"|17.8* || 2.7 || – || 5.0 || 23.8
|-
| style="text-align:left"|
| style="text-align:left;"| Kentucky (ABA)
| bgcolor="CFECEC"|84* || – || 41.7 || bgcolor="CFECEC"|.559* || .500 || .643 || bgcolor="CFECEC"|17.6* || 3.5 || – || 3.1 || 20.8
|-
| style="text-align:left;"|
| style="text-align:left;"| Kentucky (ABA)
| 84 || – || bgcolor="CFECEC"|41.7* || .493 || .000 || .667 || bgcolor="CFECEC"|18.3* || 3.9 || 0.7 || 3.4 || 18.7
|-
| style="text-align:left;background:#afe6fa;"|†
| style="text-align:left;"| Kentucky (ABA)
| 84 || – || bgcolor="CFECEC"|41.6* || .580 || .500 || .696|| 16.2 || 2.5 || 0.8 || 3.1 || 23.6
|-
| style="text-align:left;"| 
| style="text-align:left;"| Kentucky (ABA)
| 84 || – || 39.1 || .552 || – || .682 || bgcolor="CFECEC"|15.5* || 2.5 || 0.7 || 2.4 || 24.6
|-
| style="text-align:left;"| 
| style="text-align:left;"| Chicago
| 82 || – || 35.1 || .522 || – || .660 || 13.0 || 2.4 || 0.5 || 2.5 || 18.6
|-
| style="text-align:left;"| 
| style="text-align:left;"| Chicago
| 82 || – || 37.4 || .559 || – || .704 || 13.1 || 3.2 || 0.5 || 2.2 || 22.9
|-
| style="text-align:left;"| 
| style="text-align:left;"| Chicago
| bgcolor="CFECEC"|82* || – || 39.8 || .575 || – || .739 || 12.7 || 3.3 || 0.6 || 1.9 || 23.7
|-
| style="text-align:left;"| 
| style="text-align:left;"| Chicago
| 48 || – || 32.7 || .595 || – || .712 || 9.0 || 2.8 || 0.6 || 1.2 || 17.8
|-
| style="text-align:left;"| 
| style="text-align:left;"| Chicago
| 82 || – || 34.5 || bgcolor="CFECEC"|.670* || – || .705 || 10.1 || 2.1 || 0.6 || 2.4 || 17.9
|-
| style="text-align:left;"|
| style="text-align:left;"| Chicago
| 82 || 82 || 34.1 || bgcolor="CFECEC"|.652* || 1.000 || .768 || 10.2 || 1.7 || 0.6 || 2.7 || 18.5
|-
| style="text-align:left;"| 
| style="text-align:left;"| San Antonio
| 82 || 82 || 34.1 || bgcolor="CFECEC"|.626* || .000 || .740 || 12.0 || 1.5 || 0.5 || 2.3 || 18.0
|-
| style="text-align:left;| 
| style="text-align:left;"| San Antonio
| 64 || 59 || 31.8 || bgcolor="CFECEC"|.631* || .000 || .718 || 10.3 || 1.1 || 0.6 || 2.1 || 15.3
|-
| style="text-align:left;"| 
| style="text-align:left;"| San Antonio
| 81 || 81 || 34.0 || .623 || .000|| .749 || 10.4 || 1.6 || 0.5 || 2.1 || 19.1
|-
| style="text-align:left;"| 
| style="text-align:left;"| San Antonio
| 71 || 71 || 33.7 || .618 || .000 || .701 || 8.5 || 1.4 || 0.5 || 1.5 || 16.7
|-
| style="text-align:left;"|
| style="text-align:left;"| San Antonio
|bgcolor="CFECEC"|82* || 74 || 29.3 || .597 || – || .680 || 7.1 || 1.8 || 0.5 || 1.2 || 11.4
|-
| style="text-align:left;"|
| style="text-align:left;"| Chicago
|24 || 23 || 15.5 || .513 || – || .514 || 2.6 || 0.4 || 0.2 || 0.5 || 4.2
|-
| style="text-align:left;"|
| style="text-align:left;"| Boston
|47|| 4 || 11.1 || .574 || – || .527 || 3.1 || 0.3 || 0.2 || 0.4 || 3.5
|- class="sortbottom"
| style="text-align:center;" colspan=2| Career
| 1329 || 476 || 35.5 || .582 || .150 || .698 || 12.3 || 2.3 || 0.6 || 2.4 || 18.8

Playoffs

|-
| style="text-align:left;"|1972
| style="text-align:left;"| Kentucky (ABA)
| 6 || – || 47.5 || .571 || .000 || .711 || 17.7 || 4.2 || – || – || 21.8
|-
| style="text-align:left;"| 1973
| style="text-align:left;"| Kentucky (ABA)
| bgcolor="CFECEC"|19* || – || 41.1 || .544 || – || .626 || 13.7 || 3.9 || – || – || 19.0
|-
| style="text-align:left;"| 1974
| style="text-align:left;"| Kentucky (ABA)
| 8 || – || 43.0 || .559 || – || .576 || bgcolor="CFECEC"|18.6* || 3.5 || 0.9 || bgcolor="CFECEC"|3.8* || 22.5
|-
| style="text-align:left;background:#afe6fa;"| 1975†
| style="text-align:left;"| Kentucky (ABA)
| 15 || – || 45.3 || .539 || – || .772 || bgcolor="CFECEC"|17.6* || 2.5 || 1.0 || 2.1|| 24.1
|-
| style="text-align:left;"| 1976
| style="text-align:left;"| Kentucky (ABA)
| 10 || – || 39.0 || bgcolor="CFECEC"|.608* || – || .757 || bgcolor="CFECEC"|15.2* || 1.9 || 1.1 || bgcolor="CFECEC"|3.6* || 24.2
|-
| style="text-align:left;"| 1977
| style="text-align:left;"| Chicago
| 3 || – || 42.0 || .475 || – || .783 || 13.0 || 2.0 || 1.0 || 2.7 || 18.7
|-
| style="text-align:left;"| 1981
| style="text-align:left;"| Chicago
| 6 || – || 41.2 || .583 || – || .691 || 11.2 || 2.0 || 1.0 || bgcolor="CFECEC"|2.8* || 18.0
|-
| style="text-align:left;"|1983
| style="text-align:left;"| San Antonio
| 11 || – || 36.5 || .576 || – || .696 || 12.9 || 1.6 || 0.8 || 3.1 || 16.7
|-
| style="text-align:left;"| 1985
| style="text-align:left;"| San Antonio
| 5|| 5 || 37.0 || .558 || – || .689 || 10.0 || 1.4 || 0.4 || 1.4 || 17.8
|-
| style="text-align:left;"|1986
| style="text-align:left;"| San Antonio
| 3 || 3 || 35.7 || .667 || .000 || .571 || 6.0 || 1.0 || 2.3 || 0.3 || 13.3
|-
| style="text-align:left"| 1988
| style="text-align:left;"| Boston
| 14 || 0 || 6.1 || .500 || – || .500 || 1.4 || 0.1 || 0.0 || 0.3 || 1.1
|- class="sortbottom"
| style="text-align:center;" colspan=2| Career
| 	100 || 8 || 36.3 || .561 || .000 || .688|| 12.7 || 2.3 || 0.8 || 2.2 || 17.7

See also
List of National Basketball Association career blocks leaders
List of National Basketball Association top individual field goal percentage seasons
List of National Basketball Association players with most blocks in a game
List of NCAA Division I men's basketball season rebounding leaders
List of NCAA Division I men's basketball players with 30 or more rebounds in a game

References

Further reading

External links

 
 NBA.com: Artis Gilmore Summary
 Radio Interview With Artis Gilmore "The Week Artis Is Inducted Into Hall of Fame" – Miller on Sports Radio

1949 births
Living people
African-American basketball players
All-American college men's basketball players
American expatriate basketball people in Italy
American men's basketball players
Basketball players from Alabama
Basketball players from Florida
Boston Celtics players
Centers (basketball)
Chicago Bulls draft picks
Chicago Bulls players
Fortitudo Pallacanestro Bologna players
Gardner–Webb Runnin' Bulldogs men's basketball players
Jacksonville Dolphins men's basketball players
Junior college men's basketball players in the United States
Kentucky Colonels draft picks
Kentucky Colonels players
Naismith Memorial Basketball Hall of Fame inductees
National Basketball Association All-Stars
Parade High School All-Americans (boys' basketball)
People from Chipley, Florida
San Antonio Spurs players
Sportspeople from Dothan, Alabama
21st-century African-American people
20th-century African-American sportspeople